Jesús Bandrés (born 30 January 1991) is a Venezuelan former professional tennis player.

Bandrés, known as “Chucho”, was raised in Caracas and ranked amongst the world's top 100 players on the ITF Junior Circuit. One of the highlights of his junior career was winning the doubles title at the Copa del Cafe. He went on to play collegiate tennis in the United States for East Tennessee State University, where in 2012 he was named the Atlantic Sun Tournament MVP. In 2014 he debuted for the Venezuela Davis Cup team in a tie against Uruguay. He played Davis Cup again in 2017 when he was recalled despite being largely absent from the professional tour. At the time he was serving as assistant men's coach of Washington University in St. Louis.

ITF Futures finals

Doubles: 5 (1–4)

References

External links
 
 
 

1991 births
Living people
Venezuelan male tennis players
Sportspeople from Caracas
Competitors at the 2014 Central American and Caribbean Games
Central American and Caribbean Games bronze medalists for Venezuela
Central American and Caribbean Games medalists in tennis
East Tennessee State Buccaneers athletes
College men's tennis players in the United States
Washington University Bears men's tennis coaches